Teng Xiu (died 288), courtesy name Xianxian, was a military general of the state of Eastern Wu during the late Three Kingdoms period (220–280) of China. After the fall of Wu in 280, he continued serving under the Jin dynasty. He is sometimes tied to a legend about the Temple of the Five Immortals in present-day Guangzhou, Guangdong.

Life
Teng Xiu was from Xi'e County, Nanyang Commandery, which is around present-day Nanzhao County, Henan. He started his career as an official in the state of Eastern Wu in the late Three Kingdoms period and was enfeoffed as the Marquis of Xi'e for his contributions.

During the reign of the fourth and last Wu emperor Sun Hao, Teng Xiu succeeded Xiong Mu as the Inspector of Guang Province and was known for being a capable governor. Around 279, when Guo Ma started a rebellion against Wu rule in Guang Province, Sun Hao ordered Teng Xiu to lead Wu imperial forces to suppress the revolt. He also promoted Teng Xiu to the rank of Governor, gave him an additional appointment as General Who Guards the South, and granted him full authority and control over the military forces in Guang Province.

In 280, while Teng Xiu was busy dealing with the rebels, enemy forces from Eastern Wu's rival state, the Jin dynasty, invaded Wu. Teng Xiu then led troops from Guang Province to counter the invasion, but by the time he reached Baqiu (巴丘; present-day Yueyang, Hunan), Sun Hao had surrendered to the Jin dynasty, thus bringing an end to Eastern Wu's existence. Teng Xiu was so depressed that he wept and returned to Guang Province. Later, he surrendered to the Jin dynasty as well, along with Lü Feng (閭豐; the Inspector of Guang Province) and Wang Yi (王毅; the Administrator of Cangwu Commandery).

Some time later, Emperor Wu of the Jin dynasty issued an imperial decree to appoint Teng Xiu as General Who Stabilises the South and Governor of Guang Province, in addition to granting him full authority and control over Guang Province as he did during Sun Hao's reign. Emperor Wu also enfeoffed Teng Xiu as the Marquis of Wudang. Teng Xiu died in 288.

See also
 Lists of people of the Three Kingdoms

References

 Chen, Shou (3rd century). Records of the Three Kingdoms (Sanguozhi).
 Fang, Xuanling (ed.) (648). Book of Jin (Jin Shu).
 Pei, Songzhi (5th century). Annotations to Records of the Three Kingdoms (Sanguozhi zhu).

Year of birth unknown
288 deaths
Eastern Wu politicians
Politicians from Nanyang, Henan
Jin dynasty (266–420) politicians
Jin dynasty (266–420) generals
Eastern Wu generals
Political office-holders in Guangdong